The Barton-upon-Humber Assembly Rooms is a Grade II listed building in Barton-upon-Humber, North Lincolnshire, opened in 1843 as a Temperance Hall.

Architecture
The building is two storeys in height and is built from local, red bricks capped with a Welsh slate roof. On the Queen's street frontage it has a central 6-panel door under an oblong fanlight within a pilastered doorcase with projecting cornice. This main entrance is flanked by two additional doorways, each a 4-panel door beneath an oblong fanlight. There are sashed windows with sixteen panes on the ground floor and twenty-four panes on the first floor. Each window has a channelled and cambered stone lintel with a larger central keystone. Above the first floor windows are recessed brick panels. At the top of this frontage, there is a stepped brick cornice. A stone plaque above the main door is carved with the words 'Assembly Rooms'. To the left of this is a  blue plaque recording its construction as a Temperance Hall in 1843.

History and use
The building was constructed in 1843 as a Temperance Hall at a cost of £700 following the formation of a Temperance Society in Barton in 1837. In 1903 the building was closed and offered for sale. In it was re-opened as the Assembly Rooms.

It is currently used as the offices for Barton Town Council.

Gallery

References

Assembly rooms
Grade II listed buildings in North Lincolnshire
Buildings and structures in Lincolnshire
1843 establishments in England
Dance venues in England
Barton-upon-Humber